Linda Zetchiri (born 27 July 1987) is a Bulgarian badminton player. She competed in the women's singles at the 2016 and 2020 Summer Olympics.

Career 
Zetchiri is one of the leading Bulgarian players in the sport. She was the bronze medallists at the 2005 European Junior and 2012 European Championships. She competed at the 2015 Baku and 2019 Minsk European Games.

Personal life 
Zetchiri was born in Sofia (Bulgaria) of mixed ancestry. has Kosovo Albanian (through her grandfather) and Italian roots (on her grandmother's side). And her mom is Bulgarian. Her sister, Dzhema, serves as her sports manager.

Achievements

European Championships 
Women's singles

European Junior Championships 
Girls' singles

BWF Grand Prix (2 runners-up) 
The BWF Grand Prix had two levels, the Grand Prix and Grand Prix Gold. It was a series of badminton tournaments sanctioned by the Badminton World Federation (BWF) and played between 2007 and 2017.

Women's singles

  BWF Grand Prix Gold tournament
  BWF Grand Prix tournament

BWF International Challenge/Series (9 titles, 13 runners-up) 
Women's singles

  BWF International Challenge tournament
  BWF International Series tournament

See also 
 Bulgarian National Badminton Championships

References

External links 

 

1987 births
Living people
Sportspeople from Sofia
Bulgarian people of Albanian descent
Bulgarian people of Kosovan descent
Bulgarian people of Italian descent
Bulgarian female badminton players
Badminton players at the 2016 Summer Olympics
Badminton players at the 2020 Summer Olympics
Olympic badminton players of Bulgaria
Badminton players at the 2015 European Games
Badminton players at the 2019 European Games
European Games competitors for Bulgaria